Hornblower is a surname. Notable people with the surname include:

People
Edward Thomas Hornblower (1828–1901), U.S. investment banker, son of Henry, partner in Hornblower & Weeks, namesake of Edward Hornblower House and Barn
Henry Hornblower (1863–1941), U.S. investment banker, founder of Hornblower & Weeks
Jabez Carter Hornblower (1744–1814), pioneer steam engineer
Joseph Hornblower (1696?–1762), steam pioneer who installed Newcomen engines in Cornwall
Joseph Coerten Hornblower (1777–1864), American lawyer and Chief Justice of the New Jersey Supreme Court
Joseph Coerten Hornblower (architect) (1848–1908), American architect
Josiah Cheston Hornblower (born 1975), heir of Vanderbilt/Whitney family
Josiah Hornblower (1729-1809), steam pioneer and American politician
Jonathan Hornblower (1753-1815), Cornish engineer and inventor
Jonathan Hornblower (1717) (1717-1780), steam pioneer, father of Jonathan and Jabez Hornblower
Lewis Hornblower (1823-1879), Liverpool architect 
Margot Hornblower (born 1950; née Roosevelt), U.S. journalist, ex-wife of Ralph Hornblower III
Ralph Hornblower III (born 1948), American lawyer and operatic tenor
Simon Hornblower (born 1949), Professor of Classics at University College London
William B. Hornblower (1851-1914), New York jurist

Pseudonyms, stagenames
Nathanial Hörnblowér, a pseudonym of the musician Adam Yauch

Fictional people
Horatio Hornblower, fictional Napoleonic Wars–era Royal Navy officer, the protagonist of a series of novels and stories by C. S. Forester
 Hornblower, the DC Comics superhero alter-ego of Mal Duncan

See also

 Justice Hornblower (disambiguation)